Tom Piotrowski (born 1967) is an Australian economist working for financial services company CommSec as a market analyst.

Media
Piotrowski regularly presents stock market updates for CommSec on Australian television.

As a result of his presence on television, he has become a cult figure, including inspiring fansites on social networking sites Facebook and Myspace. Rove McManus paid tribute to him on his show Rove Live with regular crosses to Tom Piotrowski detailing the week in finance throughout 2009.

In 2013, his decision to grow a beard led to Facebook groups supporting and opposing the move and a media report asking 'Has Commsec guy Tom Piotrowski gone too far with his caveman beard?'.

References

Australian economists
Australian television personalities
Internet memes
Living people
Year of birth uncertain
Commonwealth Bank people
Year of birth missing (living people)